The Lease Islands, formerly called the Uliasers or Uliassers, are a group of three inhabited islands (and smaller uninhabited islets), lying immediately to the south of Seram and east of Ambon Island in the province of Maluku, in Indonesia. The three inhabited islands, from west to east, are Haruku, Saparua and Nusa Laut, while tiny uninhabited Molana is administratively part of Saparua District; these islands constitute four administrative districts (kecamatan) within Central Maluku Regency.

Note: (a) Figures for Saparua Timur's population in 2010 are included in those for Saparua.

Sources
Muller, Dr. Kal (1990). Spice Islands: The Moluccas. Periplus Editions. .

References

Islands of the Maluku Islands
Landforms of Maluku (province)
Archipelagoes of Indonesia